Victim of the New Disease is the ninth studio album by American metalcore band All That Remains. It was released on November 9, 2018 on Razor & Tie Records. It is the final album to feature founding guitarist Oli Herbert, who died on October 17, 2018, less than a month prior to the album's release and the last album with bassist Aaron Patrick before his departure in 2021. The album marks a return to the band's heavier metalcore roots. Victim of the New Disease sold over 5,300 copies in the United States in its first week of release to land at position No. 154 on Billboard 200 chart.

Background
The first single from the album was "Fuck Love". It was first posted to lead singer Phil Labonte's Instagram page as a cryptographic binary code leading to an unlisted YouTube video. The album was produced by Daniel Laskiewicz, formerly of the bands The Acacia Strain and Legend.

Reception
{{Album ratings
| rev1      = Exclaim!
| rev1Score = 
| rev2      = Heavy Magazine| rev2Score = 
| rev3      = Metal Injection
| rev3score = 
}}Victim of the New Disease has received critical acclaim from music critics, with praise being directed at a perceived return to creative and musical form as well as the return to All That Remains' heavier metalcore sound, which had largely been absent in recent material from the band in favor of a more melodic heavy metal and hard rock sound.

In a positive review for Exclaim! magazine, author Max Morin wrote "To say All That Remains are returning to their roots would oversimplify things. They have returned, but much smarter and more experienced — it's given their old formula new life. Victim of the New Disease'' has jerked All That Remains out of a decade long lull" and gave the album nine out of ten stars.

Track listing

Personnel
All That Remains
 Philip Labonte – lead vocals
 Oli Herbert – lead guitar
 Mike Martin – rhythm guitar
 Aaron Patrick – bass guitar, backing vocals
 Jason Costa – drums

Additional personnel
 Danny Worsnop - guest vocals on "Just Tell Me Something"
 Daniel Laskiewicz and Jim Fogarty - additional instrumentation

Production
 Daniel Laskiewicz – Producer
 Jim Fogarty - engineering
 Josh Wilbur - Mixing, mastering

Charts

References

2018 albums
All That Remains (band) albums
Razor & Tie albums
Albums published posthumously